The Baháʼí conception of God is monotheistic. God is viewed as the sovereign being who is the source of all existence, described as "a personal God, unknowable, inaccessible, the source of all Revelation, eternal, omniscient, omnipresent and almighty". Though transcendent and inaccessible directly, his image is reflected in his creation, which has the purpose to know and love its creator. 

According to Baháʼí teachings, God communicates his will and purpose for humanity through intermediaries known as Manifestations of God, who are the prophets and messengers who have founded religions throughout human history. Accepting these Manifestations allows individuals to draw nearer to God and attain spiritual progress.  

Baháʼís do not believe God has any human or physical form; the use of male pronouns in Baháʼí scripture is by convention rather than implicating gender. Various names are used to refer to God in the writings, the one deemed greatest being "All-Glorious" or Bahá in Arabic.

God
Baháʼís view God as the superhuman being responsible for the creation of all that exists. The teachings state there is only one God and that his essence is absolutely inaccessible from the physical realm of existence and that, therefore, his reality is completely unknowable. Thus, all of humanity's conceptions of God which have been derived throughout history are mere manifestations of the human mind and not at all reflective of His true nature. 

While God's essence is inaccessible, a subordinate form of knowledge is available by way of mediation by divine messengers, known as Manifestations of God. The Manifestations of God reveal teachings that reflect God's will and purpose for humanity at a particular time in history. By recognising these Manifestations, humanity can fulfil its inherent purpose to know and love its creator. The Baháʼí teachings state that one can develop a closer relationship with God through prayer, study of the holy writings, development of praiseworthy qualities, and service to humanity.

Although human cultures and religions differ in their conceptions of God and his nature, Baháʼís believe they nevertheless refer to one and the same being. The differences, instead of being regarded as irreconcilable, are seen as purposefully reflective of the varying needs of the societies in which different religions were revealed. No single faith, and associated conception of God, is thus considered essentially superior to another from the viewpoint of its original social context; however, more recent religions may teach a more advanced conception of God as called for by the changing needs of local, regional or global civilization.  Baháʼís thus regard the world's religions as chapters in the history of one single faith, revealed by God's Manifestations progressively and in stages. Baháʼu'lláh writes on this subject:

All praise to the unity of God, and all honor to Him, the sovereign Lord, the incomparable and all-glorious Ruler of the universe, Who, out of utter nothingness, hath created the reality of all things, Who, from naught, hath brought into being the most refined and subtle elements of His creation, and Who, rescuing His creatures from the abasement of remoteness and the perils of ultimate extinction, hath received them into His kingdom of incorruptible glory. Nothing short of His all-encompassing grace, His all-pervading mercy, could have possibly achieved it.While the Baháʼí writings teach of a personal god with faculties such as a mind, will, and purpose, they clearly state that this does not imply a human or physical form. Though God is referred to in scripture with masculine pronouns, this is by convention rather than an indication of gender. Shoghi Effendi, the head of the Baháʼí Faith in the first half of the 20th century, described God as inaccessible, omniscient, almighty, personal, and rational, and rejected pantheistic, anthropomorphic and incarnationist beliefs.

Manifestations of God

Baháʼís believe that God expresses his will to humanity through a series of divine messengers referred to as Manifestations of God, who establish a religion in the world that reflects the needs of the time. Manifestations of God throughout history have included Krishna, Zoroaster, Buddha, Moses, Christ, and Muhammad. According to Baháʼís, Baháʼu'lláh is the latest of these Manifestations.

The Manifestations of God are analogous to divine mirrors that reflect God's divine attributes, revealing aspects of God without being incarnations. Through these educators, humans are able to attain spiritual progress and draw nearer to God. On this subject, Baháʼu'lláh states:Beware, O believers in the Unity of God, lest ye be tempted to make any distinction between any of the Manifestations of His Cause, or to discriminate against the signs that have accompanied and proclaimed their Revelation. This indeed is the true meaning of Divine Unity, if ye be of them that apprehend and believe this truth. Be ye assured, moreover, that the works and acts of each and every one of these Manifestations of God, nay whatever pertaineth unto them, and whatsoever they may manifest in the future, are all ordained by God, and are a reflection of His Will and Purpose.

Names of God
The Baháʼí scriptures refer to God by various titles and attributes, such as Almighty, All-Powerful, All-Wise, Incomparable, Gracious, Helper, All-Glorious, Omniscient and All-Loving. Bahá'is believe the greatest of all the names of God is "All-Glorious" or Bahá in Arabic. Bahá is the root word of the following names and phrases: the greeting Alláh-u-Abhá (God is the All-Glorious), the invocation Yá Baháʼu'l-Abhá (O Thou Glory of the Most Glorious), Baháʼu'lláh (The Glory of God), and Baháʼí (Follower of the All-Glorious). These are expressed in Arabic regardless of the language in use (see Baháʼí symbols).

See also

 Baháʼí Faith and the unity of religion
 Conceptions of God
 Ethical monotheism
 Existence of God
 God in Abrahamic religions
 God in Christianity
 God in Judaism
 God in Islam
 God in Mormonism
 Jehovah's Witnesses beliefs § God
 Prayer in the Baháʼí Faith

Citations

Bibliography

Further reading

External links
 Bahai.org: God and His Creation

Bahá'í belief and doctrine
God in Baháʼí Faith
Names of God in the Bahá'í Faith
New religious movement deities